The GP Montelupo was a professional one-day road cycling race held annually from 1965 to 1984 in the Province of Florence, Italy.

Winners

References

Cycle races in Italy
Recurring sporting events established in 1965
1965 establishments in Italy
1984 disestablishments in Italy
Recurring sporting events disestablished in 1984
Defunct cycling races in Italy